Killer Contact (previously titled Notorious Hauntings) is an American paranormal television series on Syfy that premiered on December 4, 2013 at 10pm EST. The series features a group of paranormal researchers who investigate reported paranormal activity in haunted locations around the world including the notorious characteres these locations are associated with through history.

Format

A paranormal team travels to the world's most haunted locations where infamous crimes were committed. They try to solve these cold cases by the only method they know; gathering evidence with the help of the supernatural using their technical ghost hunting equipment, antagonization and roleplaying scenarios to communicate with them. This show is based on real historical events.

Opening Introduction (narrated by Darren O'Hare):

Cast
 Austin Cook - The Point Man
 Greg Niecestro - The Antagonizer
 Hector Barragan - The Tech Guru
 Adam Leidenfrost - The Brain
 Molly O'Connolly - The Role Player

Episodes

References

2010s American reality television series
2013 American television series debuts
English-language television shows
Paranormal reality television series
Syfy original programming
2013 American television series endings